A list of films produced by the Marathi language film industry based in Maharashtra in the year 1972.

1972 Releases
A list of Marathi films released in 1972.

References

Lists of 1972 films by country or language
1972 in Indian cinema
1972